The Swan Larson Three-Decker is a historic triple decker house in Worcester, Massachusetts.  The house was built c. 1918 and is a well-preserved local example of Colonial Revival styling.  It was listed on the National Register of Historic Places in 1990.

Description and history
The Swan Larson Three-Decker is located in Worcester's northern Greendale area, on the south side of Summerhill Avenue east of Massachusetts Route 12.  It is a three-story wood-frame structure, covered by a hip roof and finished in wooden clapboards.  Its front facade is asymmetrical, with a stack of porches on the left and a wide polygonal window bay on the right. The porches are supported by clustered columns, and topped by a fully pedimented gable with oriel window.  The ground floor porch has been enclosed in glass.  On the right side of the building, a square window bay projects, topped by a pedimented gable. The building historically had bands of trim and wooden shingles between the floors; these have been removed.

The house was built about 1918, when the Greendale area was being developed as a streetcar suburb for workers at the city's northern factories.  Its first owner, Swan Larson, was a carpenter who lived at 6 Summerhill Avenue, and owned several other triple deckers in the area.  Early residents included workers at the Norton Company and a bank teller.

See also
National Register of Historic Places listings in eastern Worcester, Massachusetts

References

Apartment buildings on the National Register of Historic Places in Massachusetts
Colonial Revival architecture in Massachusetts
Houses completed in 1918
Apartment buildings in Worcester, Massachusetts
National Register of Historic Places in Worcester, Massachusetts